The Arrow of Satan Is Drawn is the fifth studio album by Swedish death metal band Bloodbath, released on 26 October 2018 via Peaceville. It is the only album to feature guitarist Joakim Karlsson.

Background and release
In a 2017 interview with Metal Wani, frontman Nick Holmes stated that the band will enter the studio in the end of January next year to record the follow-up to Grand Morbid Funeral. The recording process had officially concluded on 23 July 2018, with hints at featuring "legendary" guests on the album. On 17 August 2018, the band have confirmed The Arrow of Satan Is Drawn as title of their new album for a 26 October release via Peaceville. A lyric video for the first single of the album "Bloodicide", which featuring Jeff Walker of Carcass, John Walker of Cancer and Karl Willetts of Memoriam and formerly of Bolt Thrower, was available for streaming on 13 September 2018. On 18 October 2018, the band released a music video for the song "Chainsaw Lullaby".

Guitarist Anders "Blakkheim" Nyström commented on The Arrow of Satan Is Drawn:

Track listing

Personnel

Bloodbath
 Bloodbath – production, engineering, art direction
 Old Nick – vocals, songwriting (7)
 Joakim (Karlsson) – lead guitar, songwriting (3, 9, 11 & 12)
 Blakkheim – rhythm guitar, songwriting (2, 5, 7, 9 & 10) 
 Lord Seth – bass guitar, songwriting (1, 4, 6 & 8)
 Axe – drums

Additional musicians
 Jeff Walker – guest vocals 
 John Walker  – guest vocals 
 Karl Willetts – guest vocals 
 Plytet (Tomas Åkvik)  – guitar solo

Production
 Karl Daniel Lidén – engineering, mixing, mastering
 Eliran Kantor – cover art
 Matt Vickerstaff – artwork, layout
 Steve Brown – photography
 John Sjölin – co-writer on "Only the Dead Survive"

Charts

References

2018 albums
Bloodbath albums
Peaceville Records albums